Rugby Lyons Piacenza is an Italian rugby union club currently competing in Top12. It is based in Piacenza in Emilia Romagna.

Current squad
Lyons Piacenza squad for 2022–23 season:

Chronicle

References

External links
 Official site

Rugby clubs established in 1963
Italian rugby union teams
Serie A (rugby union) teams